Leslie Richard Harvey (10 November 1909 – 12 August 1990) was an Australian rules footballer who played with Collingwood in the Victorian Football League (VFL).

Notes

External links 

		
Les Harvey's profile at Collingwood Forever

1909 births
1990 deaths
Australian rules footballers from Victoria (Australia)
Collingwood Football Club players
Camberwell Football Club players